Michele Kort (January 30, 1950 –  June 26, 2015) was an American journalist, author, and editor.

Early life and education 
Michele Kort, was born January 30, 1950, and was raised in California's San Fernando Valley.

She attended the University of California, Los Angeles, where she received both a Bachelor's in Art History in 1971 and a Master of Business in Arts Management in 1975.

Career

Early career 

While completing her MBA, Kort became involved with the Women's Building, an early feminist art space in Los Angeles, where she served as an early administrator and would later serve as director. Kort remained passionate about feminist art, as well as other forms of women's cultural production, a passion which often found its way into her work as a journalist. Of particular interest to Kort was women's sports, and she herself played basketball at UCLA in the 1960s and 1970s, before the advent of Title IX.

Journalism 
Kort's award-winning career in journalism began with The Grantsmanship News and spanned many decades.

Kort served as the senior editor of Ms. Magazine, from 2003 – 2015. During her tenure, she played a major role in developing online content for the publication and mentored many young women writers. Other publications Kort worked on include "Songwriter," "Living Fit," and "UCLA Magazine." As a freelance journalist, her articles have been featured in LA Times Magazine, The Advocate, Ms., L.A. Weekly, Women's Sports and Fitness, and Vegetarian Times. Kort was the author of four published books.

Soul Picnic: The Music and Passion of Laura Nyro was the first published biography of '60s musician Laura Nyro.

Death 
Kort died on June 26, 2015.

Works 

 Tenure in Museums (1974) Los Angeles: Graduate School of Management, UCLA [with Jacquelyn Maguire]
 Some of My Friends (1975) Los Angeles: Women's Community Press
 The Big Search (1977) Los Angeles: Grantmanship Center [with Philicia Malo]
 The End of Innocence: A Memoir (2002) Los Angeles: Advocate Books [with Chaz Bono]
 Soul Picnic: The Music and Passion of Laura Nyro (2003) New York: St. Martin's Press
 Dinah!: Three Decades of Sex, Golf, and Rock 'n' Roll (2005) Los Angeles: Alyson Books
 Here Come the Brides: Reflections on Lesbian Love and Marriage (2012) Berkeley, Calif.: Seal Press [with Audrey Bilger]

Awards 

 Deems Taylor Award
 Western Publishing Association
 ASCAP: 1980, for music journalism
 Council for Advancement and Support of Education (CASE): 1991, for advancement of the support of education
 Women's Sports Foundation: 1993, Miller Light women's Sports Journalism Award
 L.A. Press Club: 1994, journalism award

References

External links 

 Michele Kort papers at the Sophia Smith Collection, Smith College Special Collections

1950 births
2015 deaths
American women journalists
University of California, Los Angeles alumni
American women writers
21st-century American women